The flag of Saratov Oblast was adopted on 5 September 1996 and was modified on 23 May 2001.

The red bottom is 1/3 of the total height and the white stripe is 2/3 of the total height. In the center of the white field is the coat of arms, surrounded by branches of oak and laurel in the gold color.

References

Flags of Russia
Flag
Flags displaying animals